, or Nōtoridake, is one of the major peaks in the Akaishi Mountains, along with Mount Kita and Mount Aino. The  peak lies to the south of the other mountains, spanning the town of Hayakawa in Yamanashi Prefecture and Aoi-ku in the city of Shizuoka, Shizuoka Prefecture, Japan.

Geography 
The top of the mountain is divided into two peaks. It is located in the Minami Alps National Park.

The main mountains of the Akaishi Mountains are Mount Kitadake, Mount Aino and Mount Nōtori. The three mountains together are called , which means "three white summits".

Mountain huts 

Gallery

See also 

 List of mountains in Japan
 Three-thousanders (in Japan)
 Akaishi Mountains
 Minami Alps National Park

References 

Notori, Mount
Notori, Mount